Felix N'sa (born September 25, 2003) is a Canadian professional soccer player.

Early life
N'sa played youth soccer with CS Panellinios. In 2020, he went on trial with Pacific FC of the Canadian Premier League.

Club career
In November 2020, he signed a multi-year professional contract, beginning in the 2021 season, with York United FC of the Canadian Premier League. However, he suffered an injury during pre-season, which caused him to miss the entire 2021 season. In February 2022, he went on loan to fellow CPL club FC Edmonton. After still rehabbing from his previous injury upon his arrival to Edmonton, he made his professional debut on October 8, 2022 against Valour FC. At the conclusion of the season, York declined N'sa's option for the 2023 season.

Personal life 
He is the younger brother of Chrisnovic N'sa, who is also a professional soccer player.

Career statistics

References

External links
 

Living people
2003 births
Canadian soccer players
Soccer players from Montreal
Canadian people of Democratic Republic of the Congo descent
Black Canadian soccer players
Association football defenders
Canadian Premier League players
York United FC players
FC Edmonton players